Kashani Isamara Ríos Miller (born 7 February 1991) is a female Panamanian track and field athlete who specialises in the high jump. She has represented her country at the 2015 Pan American Games, 2014 South American Games and the 2011 Summer Universiade. She was a bronze medallist at the South American Championships in Athletics.

She attended the University of Panama.

International competitions

References

External links

Living people
1991 births
Panamanian high jumpers
Female high jumpers
Pan American Games competitors for Panama
Athletes (track and field) at the 2015 Pan American Games
South American Games silver medalists for Panama
South American Games medalists in athletics
Central American Games gold medalists for Panama
Central American Games medalists in athletics
Central American Games silver medalists for Panama
Competitors at the 2014 South American Games
Competitors at the 2011 Summer Universiade
Central American and Caribbean Games medalists in athletics